Juju (also Romanized as Jūjū; also known as Mazra‘eh Jūjū) is a village in Var Posht Rural District, in the Central District of Tiran and Karvan County, Isfahan Province, Iran. At the 2006 census, its population was 41, in 11 families.

References 

Populated places in Tiran and Karvan County